Susan G. Amara is an American professor of neuroscience and is the Scientific Director of the National Institute of Mental Health. Dr. Amara is an elected member of the National Academy of Sciences and a fellow of the American Association for the Advancement of Science. She is a Past-President of the Society for Neuroscience. Dr. Amara has a B.S. in Biological Sciences from Stanford University and a Ph.D. in Physiology and Pharmacology from the University of California, San Diego.

Career 

Amara was a faculty at Yale University and the Vollum Institute as an HHMI Investigator. She was elected as a member of the National Academy of Sciences in 2004, and became a fellow of the AAAS in 2007.

Her main research interests are the parts of the brain that get activated when people take certain addictive drugs, specifically attention deficit hyperactive disorder (ADHD) medicine (Adderall and Ritalin), cocaine, and antidepressants. Amara's laboratory examined the impact of psychostimulant and antidepressant drugs on the signaling properties, physiology and regulation of two families of sodium-dependent neurotransmitter transporters, which are the biogenic amine and the excitatory amino acid carriers. Amara is an elected member of the National Academy of Sciences and a fellow member of the AAAS. From 2010 to 2011, she has served on the Board of Scientific Counselors for the National Institute on Drug Abuse (NIDA) and for the National Institute on Alcohol Abuse and Alcoholism, as a Secretary-Treasurer of ASPET, and as the 2011 President of the Society for Neuroscience. She also serves as an Associate Editor for the Annual Review of Pharmacology and Toxicology and is the editorial board of PNAS.

In 2011, she testified before the United States Senate in support of funding for the National Institutes of Health (NIH). She argued in favor of funding by citing past successful NIH-funded projects that helped researchers find new ways to treat mental health and neurological disorders.

In January 2013, Amara joined the DIRP becoming the NIMH Scientific Director and continues her research in her new lab at the NIMH, the Laboratory of Molecular and Cellular Neurobiology in the Section on Molecular and Cellular Signaling. Since 1992, she is the member of NIH review and advisory panels, on study section Chair on the National Advisory Council for the National Institute on Drug Abuse (NIDA), on the Board of Scientific Counselors for NIDA, and on the Board of Scientific Counselors for the National Institute on Alcohol Abuse and Alcoholism (NIAAA). She also serves as an Associate Editor for the Annual Review of Pharmacology and Toxicology and is on the editorial boards of several journals; the Proceedings of the National Academy of Sciences.

Amara's laboratory has twenty U.S. patents issued on technology.

Honors and awards 

Burroughs Wellcome Hitchings Award in drug discovery
The Society for Neuroscience Young Investigator Award
The ASPET John Jacob Abel Award
McKnight Neuroscience Investigator Award
NIH MERIT Award from NIDA
NARSAD Distinguished Investigator Award
Julius Axelrod Award from the Catecholamine Society.

References 

Year of birth missing (living people)
Living people
Yale University faculty
American neuroscientists
Stanford University School of Humanities and Sciences alumni
University of California, San Diego alumni
American women neuroscientists
Fellows of the American Association for the Advancement of Science
Members of the United States National Academy of Sciences
Fellows of the American Society for Pharmacology and Experimental Therapeutics
21st-century American women scientists